20th CFCA Awards
December 13, 2007

Best Film: 
 No Country for Old Men 

The 20th Chicago Film Critics Association Awards, given by the CFCA on December 13, 2007, honored the best in film for 2007.

Winners and nominees

Best Actor
Daniel Day-Lewis – There Will Be Blood
 George Clooney – Michael Clayton
 Ryan Gosling – Lars and the Real Girl
 Frank Langella – Starting Out in the Evening
 Viggo Mortensen – Eastern Promises

Best Actress
Elliot Page – Juno
 Julie Christie – Away from Her
 Marion Cotillard – La Vie en Rose (La môme)
 Angelina Jolie – A Mighty Heart
 Laura Linney – The Savages

Best Animated Feature
Ratatouille
 Beowulf
 Meet the Robinsons
 Persepolis
 The Simpsons Movie

Best Cinematography
No Country for Old Men – Roger Deakins The Assassination of Jesse James by the Coward Robert Ford – Roger Deakins
 Atonement – Seamus McGarvey
 The Diving Bell and the Butterfly (Le scaphandre et le papillon) – Janusz Kamiński
 There Will Be Blood – Jonny Greenwood

Best DirectorJoel Coen and Ethan Coen – No Country for Old Men
 Paul Thomas Anderson – There Will Be Blood
 David Fincher – Zodiac
 Tony Gilroy – Michael Clayton
 Jason Reitman – Juno

Best Documentary Feature
Sicko
 Darfur Now
 The King of Kong: A Fistful of Quarters
 Lake of Fire
 No End in Sight

Best Film
No Country for Old Men
 Into the Wild
 Michael Clayton
 Once
 There Will Be Blood

Best Foreign Language Film
4 Months, 3 Weeks and 2 Days (4 luni, 3 saptamani si 2 zile), Romania Black Book (Zwartboek), Netherlands
 The Diving Bell and the Butterfly (Le scaphandre et le papillon), France
 Lust, Caution (Se, jie), China/Taiwan
 The Orphanage (El orfanato), Spain
 La Vie en Rose (La môme), France

Best Original ScoreOnce – Glen Hansard and Markéta Irglová The Assassination of Jesse James by the Coward Robert Ford – Nick Cave and Warren Ellis
 Atonement – Dario Marianelli
 Lust, Caution (Se, jie) – Alexandre Desplat
 There Will Be Blood – Jonny Greenwood

Best Screenplay – AdaptedNo Country for Old Men – Joel Coen and Ethan Coen Atonement – Christopher Hampton
 Into the Wild – Sean Penn
 There Will Be Blood – Paul Thomas Anderson
 Zodiac – James Vanderbilt

Best Screenplay – OriginalJuno – Diablo Cody Before the Devil Knows You're Dead – Kelly Masterson
 Michael Clayton – Tony Gilroy
 Ratatouille – Brad Bird
 The Savages – Tamara Jenkins

Best Supporting ActorJavier Bardem – No Country for Old Men
 Casey Affleck – The Assassination of Jesse James by the Coward Robert Ford
 Philip Seymour Hoffman – Charlie Wilson's War
 Hal Holbrook – Into the Wild
 Tom Wilkinson – Michael Clayton

Best Supporting Actress
Cate Blanchett – I'm Not There
 Jennifer Jason Leigh – Margot at the Wedding
 Leslie Mann – Knocked Up
 Amy Ryan – Gone Baby Gone
 Tilda Swinton – Michael Clayton

Most Promising Director
Ben Affleck – Gone Baby Gone
 John Carney – Once
 Craig Gillespie – Lars and the Real Girl
 Tony Gilroy – Michael Clayton
 Sarah Polley – Away from Her

Most Promising Performer
Michael Cera – Juno and Superbad
 Nikki Blonsky – Hairspray
 Glen Hansard – Once
 Carice van Houten – Black Book
 Tang Wei – Lust, Caution

Notes

References
 https://web.archive.org/web/20120515203059/http://www.chicagofilmcritics.org/index.php?option=com_content&view=article&id=48&Itemid=58

 2007
2007 film awards